Nicolás Massú was the defending champion, but lost in the quarterfinals to Filippo Volandri.

Tomáš Berdych won the title by defeating Volandri 6–3, 6–3 in the final.

Seeds

Draw

Finals

Top half

Bottom half

References

External links
 Main draw (ATP)
 Qualifying draw (ATP)
 ITF tournament profile

Campionati Internazionali di Sicilia
2004 ATP Tour
Camp